Shirg Agha (also Romanized as '''Shirg Agha) is a village in Momenabad Rural District, in the Central District of Sarbisheh County, South Khorasan Province, Iran. As per the 2006 census, its population is 383.

References 

Populated places in Sarbisheh County